Tamerlan Tagziev (born September 25, 1981) is an Ossetian wrestler competing for Canada.

Career
Tagziev moved to Canada in 2009 and became a citizen in the same year. He won a gold medal in the 86 kg freestyle at the 2014 Commonwealth Games in Glasgow. He was given a four-year ban after testing positive for meldonium on 29 August 2016.

References

1981 births
Living people
Ossetian people
Wrestlers at the 2014 Commonwealth Games
Commonwealth Games gold medallists for Canada
Russian emigrants to Canada
Naturalized citizens of Canada
Doping cases in wrestling
Canadian sportspeople in doping cases
Canadian male sport wrestlers
Pan American Games bronze medalists for Canada
Commonwealth Games medallists in wrestling
Pan American Games medalists in wrestling
Wrestlers at the 2015 Pan American Games
Medalists at the 2015 Pan American Games
Medallists at the 2014 Commonwealth Games